Vivian Akinyi (born 20 May 1994) is a Kenyan footballer who plays as a goalkeeper. She has been a member of the Kenya women's national team.

International career
Akinyi played for Kenya at the 2016 Africa Women Cup of Nations.

See also
List of Kenya women's international footballers

References

1994 births
Living people
Kenyan women's footballers
Women's association football goalkeepers
Kenya women's international footballers